Point Venture is a village in western Travis County, Texas. The population was 800 as of the 2010 census.

Located on the north bank of Lake Travis, Point Venture was a second home and family vacation destination, since the early 1970s. It has matured into a community of full-time residents with over 150 children attending Lago Vista Schools. It features golfing, boating, lake access, and other amenities. Point Venture was incorporated in August 2000.

The Lago Vista Independent School District serves area students.

Geography

Point Venture is located at  (30.381662, –98.001046).

Demographics

Government 
Point Venture was incorporated in 2000 with a council-manager system of local government. The six members serve two year terms. As of June 22, 2022, Point Venture Council members are as follows:

 Mayor: Stephen Perschler
 Mayor pro tem: Shelly Molina
 Council Member: Dan Olson
 Council Member: Steve Hafner
 Council Member: Cliff McInnis
 Council Member: Scott Staeb

Point Venture is represented in Texas House of Representatives by Republican Paul D. Workman. In the State Senate, Lago Vista is represented by Democrat Kirk Watson.

References

External links
Village of Point Venture
The Point

Villages in Travis County, Texas
Villages in Texas
Greater Austin